HSDC Alton, formerly known as Alton College, is located in Alton, Hampshire, England. In addition to offering A Levels, the College provides an adult education service to the local population. It was built in 1978 and was one of the first institutions in the UK to be a purpose-built sixth form college. On 1 March 2019 it merged with Havant and South Downs College, becoming the third campus of the college.

Notable alumni
Notable former students of HSDC Alton include:
Russell Howard – comedian
Alison Goldfrapp – musician
Gwyneth Herbert – singer-songwriter
Rebecca Harris (filmmaker) – film producer
Michael Auger – singer
Ranil Jayawardena – Conservative Party MP for North East Hampshire
Yvette Cooper – Labour Member of Parliament (MP) for Normanton, Pontefract and Castleford with the positions of Shadow Home Secretary and Shadow Minister for Women and Equalities
Amber-Jade Sanderson – Australian politician
Chris Wood – cricketer

References

External links

Official website
Student-run College Magazine

International Baccalaureate schools in England
Learning and Skills Beacons
Sixth form colleges in Hampshire
Educational institutions established in 1978
Alton, Hampshire
1978 establishments in England